Leptolepides is an extinct genus of prehistoric ray-finned fish that lived during the early Tithonian stage of the Late Jurassic epoch.

See also
 List of prehistoric bony fish genera

References

External links
 

Prehistoric ray-finned fish genera
Jurassic bony fish
Jurassic fish of Asia
Jurassic fish of Europe
Solnhofen fauna